, also known as Mito Yorifusa, was a Japanese daimyō of the early Edo period.

Biography 

Known in his childhood as Tsuruchiyomaru (鶴千代丸), he was the eleventh son of Tokugawa Ieyasu, the first Tokugawa shogun with his concubine, Kageyama-dono later adopted as Okaji no Kata's son after his younger sister, Ichihime died. Yorifusa was first enfeoffed in the Shimotsuma domain (100,000 koku) from 1606 to 1609, before being transferred to Mito (Hitachi Province, 350,000 koku) in 1610, thereby founding the Mito branch of the Tokugawa house (the junior branch of the gosanke). A holder of the junior 3rd court rank (jusanmi), Yorifusa held the title of chūnagon (middle counselor), both of which he received in 1627.

Family
 Father: Tokugawa Ieyasu
 Mother: Kageyama-dono (1580–1653) later Yoju-in
 Adopted Mother: Okaji no Kata
 Wife, Concubine, Children:
 Concubine: Hisa later Kyushoin (1604-1662), daughter of Tani Shigenori
 Matsudaira Yorishige
 Tokugawa Mitsukuni
 Concubine: Okatsu no Kata later Enrin-in, daughter of Sasaki Masakatsu
 Michiko (1624-1664) betrothed to Matsudono Michiaki
 Kamemaru (1625-1628)
 Man (1627-1689) married Ota Sukemasa
 Kiku (1628-1706) married Matsudaira Yasuhiro
 Matsudaira Yoritomo (1629-1693)
 Sen (1635-1681) married Maki Kagenobu
 Matsu
 Matsudaira Yorikatsu (1630-1697)
 Concubine: Oya no Kata later Jokoin
 Kiihime (1627-1631)
 Kohime (1628-1717)
 Matsudaira Yoritaka (1629-1707)
 Matsudaira Yoriyuki (1631-1717)
 Ritsu (1632-1711) married Yamanobe Yoshikata
 Suzuki Shigeyoshi (1634-1668)
 Concubine: Kitsuke later Gyokuho-in
 Oohime (1627-1656) married Maeda Mitsutaka
 Concubine: Tama later Shonshin'in daughter of Banzo Sokenjikyozen
 Matsudaira Yoritoshi (1630-1674)
 Concubine: Aii later Tsuji'in daughter of Tanya Yorifusa
 Matsudaira Yoriyuki (1631-1664)
 Matsudaira Fusaji (1633-1682)
 Concubine: Toshi later Choshoin
 Furi (1633-1667) married Honda Masatoshi
 Take (1636-1637)
 Ume (1638-1697) married Utsunomiya Takatsuna
 Concubine: Nana later Shinje-in daughter of Oida Yasunao
 Inu (1634-1675) married Hosokawa Tsunatoshi
 Ichi (1639-1690) married Sakai Tadaharu
 Concubine: Iku later Kashin-in daughter of Takano Kiyohyou
 Kuma (1649-1709) married Ito Tomotsugu

Ancestry

References

Fukuda, Chizuru (2005). Oie-sōdō. Tokyo: Chūōkōron-shinsha.

|-

1603 births
1661 deaths
Lords of Mito
Deified Japanese people